The Elliot–Powers House and Garage is a property in Fargo, North Dakota that was determined eligible for listing on the National Register of Historic Places on April 7, 1987, with reference number 87002634.  It was not, however, actually listed, due to owner objection. Its listing status is "DO/Owner Objection".

History
It was built in 1900 in Queen Anne style for Peter Elliot, a prominent hotelier and restaurant owner. It was designed by the Hancock Brothers and built at least in part by the Fargo Cornice and Ornament Co.

The property was included in a multiple-resource nomination of historic properties on the north side of Fargo.

References

External links
 Peter Elliott at Fargo History Project (North Dakota State University). Accessed 21 August 2013
 

Houses on the National Register of Historic Places in North Dakota
Houses in Fargo, North Dakota
Houses completed in 1900
Queen Anne architecture in North Dakota
National Register of Historic Places in Cass County, North Dakota
1900 establishments in North Dakota